KNIF-LP (107.9 FM) was a radio station licensed to Scottsbluff, Nebraska, United States. The station was owned by CSN International.

The station's license was surrendered to the Federal Communications Commission on February 12, 2013, and cancelled by the FCC on February 13, 2013.

References

External links
 Query the FCC's FM station database for KNIF-LP

NIF-LP
Radio stations disestablished in 2013
Defunct radio stations in the United States
Radio stations established in 2007
2007 establishments in Nebraska
2013 disestablishments in Nebraska
Defunct religious radio stations in the United States
Defunct mass media in Nebraska